Aleksandr Mordovin (3 February 1873 – 31 March 1938) was a fencer from the Russian Empire. He competed in three events at the 1912 Summer Olympics.

References

1873 births
1938 deaths
Male fencers from the Russian Empire
Olympic competitors for the Russian Empire
Fencers at the 1912 Summer Olympics